Dwarf morning-glory is a common name for several plants and may refer to:

Convolvulus tricolor, native to Mediterranean Europe
Convolvulus cantabrica
Evolvulus